Lawrence T. Nichols (born December 21, 1947 in Chicago, Illinois) is a professor of sociology in the Division of Sociology and Anthropology at West Virginia University in Morgantown, West Virginia. Nichols is renowned for his scholarly research. He is the  editor of The American Sociologist, a peer-reviewed journal that examines the history, current status and future prospects of the discipline of sociology. His teaching method makes extensive use of categorization of concepts. He is credited with establishing criminology concentration at West Virginia University.

He received an AB (1969) and MA (1973) from Saint Louis University and a Ph.D. from Boston College in 1985.

One of his particular claims to fame is the postulation, with Anthony F. Buono, of the Stockholder–stakeholder model of corporate social responsibility in the seminal work, "Stockholder and Stakeholder Interpretation of Business' Social Role".

Sources
 Anthony F Buono and Lawrence T Nichols, "Stockholder and Stakeholder Interpretations of Business' Social Role," in Business Ethics, edited by W Michael Hoffman and Jennifer Mills Moore (New York: McGraw-Hill, 1990).
 http://www.as.wvu.edu/soca/faculty/nichols/nichols.htm

1947 births
People from Chicago
Saint Louis University alumni
Boston College alumni
West Virginia University faculty
American sociologists
Sociology educators
Living people